Ronald James "Ron" Keeble (born 14 January 1941) is a former British international cyclist.

Cycling career
He won the bronze medal in Team Pursuit at the 1972 Munich Games.

He represented England in the scratch race and time trial, at the 1970 British Commonwealth Games in Edinburgh, Scotland.

References

1941 births
Living people
English male cyclists
Cyclists at the 1968 Summer Olympics
Cyclists at the 1972 Summer Olympics
Olympic bronze medallists for Great Britain
Olympic medalists in cycling
Cyclists from Greater London
Medalists at the 1972 Summer Olympics
Cyclists at the 1970 British Commonwealth Games
Commonwealth Games competitors for England